Assiniboine Credit Union (ACU) is a credit union based in Winnipeg, Manitoba.

ACU was formed in 1943 by 15 employees of the Winnipeg Electric Company who got together to form the credit union. They named the new credit union after the street their company headquarters was on—Assiniboine Avenue.

ACU now has 18 branches in Winnipeg and Northern Manitoba. ACU merged with Astra and Vantis credit unions in 2007.

Branches 
, Assiniboine Credit Union has 18 branches: 14 in Winnipeg and 2 in northern Manitoba—Thompson and Gillam.

, ACU has three community economic development, one in Gillam and the other two in the West Broadway and North End neighborhoods of Winnipeg. These branches are deliberately placed in low-income areas in order to provide financial services to those ignored by the large commercial banks.

The North End location was opened in 2012, on McGregor Street at College Avenue, as the area was previously unserviced by financial institutions for 10 years. Camilla, Duchess of Cornwall toured the facility upon her visit to Winnipeg to learn more about Manitoba Credit Unions.

History 
In 1943, under the backdrop of World War II and its impact on the world's economies, Ed McCaffrey and 8 co-workers from the Winnipeg Electric Company formed Assiniboine Credit Union, naming it after the street its headquarters was on—Assiniboine Avenue. Many Manitobans at the time were subjected to high interest rates charged by money lenders. McCaffrey and his colleagues thereby established ACU as an open bond credit union that welcomed everyone in the community to join.

In 2020, Assiniboine Credit Union received its B Corporation certification, after received an assessment score of 166.4, the highest in Canada and 6th highest in the world among over 3,500 certified B Corps.

Mergers 

Mergers have been a large part of the history and success of credit unions over the years. ACU's history of mergers began in 1948, when Winnipeg Postal District Employees and Federal Employees of Manitoba merged with Keystone Credit Union, which ultimately merged with Assiniboine Credit Union in 1979.

On 24 June 2021, Assiniboine Credit Union signed a formal agreement to merge with Entegra Credit Union, followed by a public announcement 5 days later. Formally taking effect on 1 January 2022, the new entity will retain the Assiniboine Credit Union name; likewise, the current President and CEO of ACU, Kevin Sitka, will head the new credit union, while the CEO of Entegra, Brent Turman, will become Chief Operations and Strategic Initiatives Officer.

Awards 
Awards received by ACU include:

 2022: Merger with Entegra Credit Union
 2016-2021: named one of Manitoba's Top Employers
 2016 & 2018: Manitoba Start 2018 Legacy Award for Excellence
 2020: National Credit Union Learning Excellence Award
 2017: Cooperative Youth Leadership Award
 2016: named one of Canada's Best Employers for New Canadians
 2013-2021: named one of Canada’s Greenest Employers
 2018: Gold Commuter Challenge
 2017 & 2015: National Credit Union Social Responsibility Award
 2014: Anne Lindsey Protecting Our Earth Award
 2019: 2019 Spirit of Winnipeg winner
 2018: Spirit of Community Award (MNPHA Spirit of Housing Awards 2018)
 2017: named Top 3 in Canada in member service
 2017: PMI Project of the Year Award
 2017: Manitoba Co-op Association Youth Leadership Award
 2016: National Community Economic Development Award
 2018: two Canadian Credit Union Association marketing awards (2018 Achievement in Marketing Excellence Awards Gala)

References

External links
Assiniboine Credit Union website
Assiniboine Credit Union media release

Credit unions of Manitoba
Companies based in Winnipeg
Assiniboia, Winnipeg
B Lab-certified corporations